All Saints' Church, also known as Lydd Church or The Cathedral on the Marsh, is a church in Lydd, Kent, South East England. It belongs to the Diocese of Canterbury. The church is thought to incorporate a small Romano-British basilica possibly built in the 5th century, though most of the current fabric is medieval. It was associated with local fraternities or guilds in the 15th century and could seat 1,000 people at a time. Severely damaged by World War II bombing, the church was subsequently restored and is now a Grade I listed building.

History

The church was long thought to be Saxon in origin, but recent studies have dated the oldest section to the latter half of the 5th century, making it Romano-British. It appears to incorporate a very small basilica which had an apse, an arcade on the north side of three bays, and an elaborate porch on the west side. This is considerably different from Anglo-Saxon churches, leading to a Romano-British attribution.

In the fifteenth century, a number of Fraternities or Guilds of lay parishioners were connected with the church. Each of these fraternities held services in a different part of the church, either at a special altar of its patron saint, or before the image of that saint; and each fraternity maintained a light before the altar, or image of its patron. In the fifteenth century, the Fraternities were those of the Holy Trinity, All Saints, St. James, St. Peter, St. Mary, St. Katherine, St. John the Baptist, and St. George. In the following century, St. Barbara, St. Anthony, St. Mildred, and St. Nicholas were added. The church registers for christenings and marriages began in 1542 and for burials in 1539.

The church interior was restored in the 18th century when box pews were replaced with oak pews to give a seating capacity of 1,000. The church was extensively damaged during World War II; in 1940 the chancel was destroyed by a stray bomb; being re-built after the war in the early English style and removing the Victorian 'restoration' of the east end. Rectors include Thomas Wolsey (who later became Cardinal) though it is doubtful that he ever attended, as he held a number of churches in plurality, employing a curate and keeping the tithes for himself.

The church became a Grade I listed building on 28 November 1950.

Architecture and fittings
The stone church is built in three styles, Early English, Decorated, and Perpendicular. The church, built of ragstone rubble with a tiled roof, received pews and a new roof over the nave during the reigns of Edward IV and Richard III. The west tower, at 132 feet, is one of the tallest in Kent, with a fine peal of eight bells, recast in 1926 from an earlier, 17th century peal of five. This tower is dated to between 1435 and 1450 and is crenellated with 4 crockets. The roof of the nave contains moulded and battlemented tie-beams, ornamental bracket-shaped wall-pieces, moulded wall plates, octagonal king posts.

There was a chapel dedicated to St Mary, an altar and a chapel of St. John the Baptist, in one of the side chancels; there were altars dedicated to St Peter, the Holy Trinity, and St James. A window depicting the Seven Sacraments was bequeathed in 1476 by John Seawlys.

A collection of 17 brasses are commonly kept from view beneath the nave carpet. Within the church, the ancient family of Godfrey of Lydd are represented by a brass in the 13th-century nave which has the date 1430 upon it, and a bust set in the north wall of the chancel. Descendants of this family are to be found on World War I and II memorials. The church was adorned with paintings, and writings provided by churchwarden John Marketman in 1611. Around 1428, new organs were purchased, which were repaired 26 years later. The church contains a 16th-century memorial to Thomas Godfrey and an effigy of Sir Walter de Meryl, Lord of the Manor of Jacques Court. Also of note is a roundel carved in marble by John Flaxman, dedicated to Anne Russell and her son.

Grounds
The earliest existing tomb in the churchyard belongs to the Strugell family and dates from 1551. Extrapolating from the work of the late Mr. Leland Duncan, "The Monumental Inscriptions in Lydd Church and Churchyard", it is evident that a large number of sailors rest in the parish churchyard, all victims of the stormy seas along this dangerous coast. Of these, six were drowned with the wreck of the "Northfleet" in January 1873, and Tom Edgar who was with Captain Cook in 1779.  The tower overlooks an old holm oak, on top of which rest heron nests.

References

15th-century church buildings in England
Grade I listed churches in Kent
Church of England church buildings in Kent
Diocese of Canterbury
5th-century establishments in England
All Saints